Ambachew Mekonnen (– 22 June 2019) was an Ethiopian politician and economist who served as the president of the Amhara Region of Ethiopia from March to June 2019, when he was assassinated in a coup attempt.

Life 
Ambachew Mekonnen was born in Aketo, Gayint, South Gondar, to a family of farmers. His secondary education was interrupted due to the Ethiopian Civil War, when his school was closed, and he joined the Ethiopian People's Democratic Movement (EPDM, later ANDM) as a guerrilla in 1990. He completed his secondary studies via distance education and was appointed an administrator in Abichuna Gne'a and Sheno in North Shewa.

He went on to receive a BA in economics from the Ethiopian Civil Service University, an MPP from the Korea Development Institute, and an MSc in international finance and economic development and a PhD in Economics from the University of Kent, writing his dissertation on "Economic growth, trade and investment in sub-Saharan Africa: nexus and determinants”.

Before his appointment as president of the Amhara Region, he served in various roles, including the Ministry of Housing and Urban Development, Ethiopia. He also served as an infrastructure adviser in the Prime Minister's office prior to his selection as regional President on 6 March 2019, replacing Gedu Andargachew.

Ambachew was killed on 22 June 2019 in Bahir Dar, Ethiopia, by a supposed hit squad organized by Abiy Ahmed Ali(Prime Minister of Ethiopia) during a coup attempt in the Amhara region. He was killed along with his adviser.

References 

1970s births
2019 deaths
Presidents of Amhara Region
Government ministers of Ethiopia
Ethiopian People's Revolutionary Democratic Front politicians
People killed in the Ethiopian civil conflict (2018–present)
Assassinated Ethiopian politicians
2019 murders in Ethiopia
Alumni of the University of Kent
21st-century Ethiopian politicians